Ozerov or Ozerova (feminine} is a Russian surname that derives from the word ozero, meaning lake.

Notable people
Notable people with this surname include:

Men
 Lev Ozerov (1914–1996), Soviet poet
 Nikolai Ozerov (singer) (1887–1953), a Russian and Soviet opera singer and People's Artist of the USSR
 Nikolai Ozerov (1922–1997), Soviet tennis player and actor, who was best known as a leading sports commentator of the Soviet Union in the 1950s–80s
 Vitaly Ozerov (1917–2007), a Soviet literary critic  
 Vladislav Ozerov (1769–1816), a Russian dramatist
 Vladislav Sergeyevich Ozerov (born 1995), Russian footballer
 Yuri Ozerov (director) (1921–2001), a Soviet film director and People's Artist of the USSR
 Yuri Ozerov (basketball) (1928–2004), a Soviet basketball player
 Ozerov Ivan Khristoforovich (1869–1942), Russian professor, financier, economist

Women
 Ksenia Ozerova (born 1991), a Russian pair skater